Alphabetic Presentation Forms is a Unicode block containing standard ligatures for the Latin, Armenian, and Hebrew scripts.

Block

History
The following Unicode-related documents record the purpose and process of defining specific characters in the Alphabetic Presentation Forms block:

See also 
Armenian (Unicode block)
Latin alphabet in Unicode
Hebrew alphabet in Unicode
Precomposed character
Arabic Presentation Forms-A
Arabic Presentation Forms-B

References 

Unicode blocks
Latin script